Sphingobacterium shayense is a bacterium from the genus of Sphingobacterium which has been isolated from forest soil from a Populus euphratica forest in Xinjiang in China.

References

External links
Type strain of Sphingobacterium shayense at BacDive -  the Bacterial Diversity Metadatabase

Sphingobacteriia
Bacteria described in 2010